Inquisiq R4 is a web-based SCORM compliant Learning Management System (LMS) that is owned by ICS Learning Group Inc. Inquisiq R4 is used for delivering and tracking both e-learning courseware and traditional training. The product is available as either a Software-as-a-Service (SaaS) model or an unlimited user on-premises model hosted by the customer or the vendor.

Product information

General
Inquisiq R4 was first launched in 2002 under the name "Inquisiq LMS". A second generation product was released in 2005 as "Inquisiq EX" and a third generation product was released in 2009 as "Inquisiq R3." The current version, Inquisiq R4, was released in 2015 and added an updated user interface, multilingual capability (English and up to 12 additional languages), and gamification features.  It is a web-based software application developed in ASP/.NET and can be hosted on recent Windows Server and SQL platforms. As of 2016, Inquisiq has over 3 million users on its platform.

The Inquisiq interface provides standard and advanced LMS functionality, including
Searchable course catalogs and user self-enrollment options
Learning activity tracking and reporting
Configurable user profiles 
e-Commerce
Course enrollment and workflow automation
Certificates
User and Group Management
Permission management
Multilingual interface
Gamification
API 
Microsoft Active Directory Integration (Single Sign On)

Server Requirements
Recommended:
Microsoft SQL Server 2008 R2 (Standard Edition or higher) or higher
Dual Processor @ 2.0 GHz or higher
2 GB RAM
.NET Framework 3.5 Service Pack 1
Internet Information Services (IIS) 7.x

Awards and recognition
Top 3 LMS for Small Business - "2016 Top 50 LMSs Report" 
Brandon Hall Group 2014 Silver Medal for “Best Advance in Learning Management Technology for Compliance Training”
Brandon Hall Group 2013 Silver Medal for “Best Advance in Learning Management Technology for Small- and Medium-Sized Businesses”
Brandon Hall Group 2012 Silver Medal for “Best Advance in Learning Management Technology for Small- and Medium-Sized Businesses”
Brandon Hall Group 2011 Gold Medal for “Best Advance in Learning Management Technology for Small- and Medium-Sized Businesses” 
Brandon Hall Group 2010 Gold Medal for “Best Advance in Learning Management Technology for Small- and Medium Sized Businesses”
Brandon Hall Group 2010 Gold Medal for “Best Advance in Learning Management Technology for External Training”
Brandon Hall Group 2009 Gold Medal for “Best Advance in Learning Management Technology for Small- and Medium Sized Businesses”

References

Computer-related introductions in 2002
2002 software
Educational software for Windows